This is a list of blockchains - decentralized, cryptographic databases - and other distributed ledgers.

See also 

 Category:Blockchains
 List of cryptocurrencies

References

General refs 

 https://arxiv.org/pdf/1708.05665.pdf

External links 
 https://www.blockchainalmanac.com/blockchains/
 https://chainlist.org/

Blockchains
Blockchains